Walter Binder (born 14 December 1958) is a retired Austrian footballer who played as a midfielder.

External links
 
 

1958 births
Living people
Austrian footballers
Association football midfielders
FC Admira Wacker Mödling players
SK Sturm Graz players
Austrian football managers
Wiener Sport-Club managers
SV Stockerau players
Favoritner AC players
Wiener Sport-Club players
Footballers from Vienna